"Mr. Volunteer, or, You don't Belong To The Regulars You're Just A Volunteer" is a musical score for voice and piano written by Paul Dresser. The score was first published in 1901 by Howley, Haviland & Dresser in New York, NY.

The sheet music can be found at the Pritzker Military Museum & Library.

References

External links 
View sheet music at the New York Public Library Digital Collections

1901 songs
Songs written by Paul Dresser